Edward Pemberton may refer to:

 Edward Leigh Pemberton (1823–1910), English politician
 Edward Loines Pemberton (1844–1878), philatelist and stamp dealer